These hits topped the Dutch Top 40 in 1984.

See also
1984 in music

References

1984 in the Netherlands
1984 record charts
1984